867 Kovacia (prov. designation:  or ) is an elongated, dark asteroid and member of the Hygiea family from the outer regions of the asteroid belt. It was discovered on 25 February 1917, by astronomer Johann Palisa at the Vienna Observatory in Austria. It was named after Austrian physician Friedrich Kovacs (1861–1931).

Orbit and classification 

According to Zappalà's classification of dynamical families, and when applying the synthetic hierarchical clustering method (HCM) by Nesvorný, Kovacia is a member of the Hygiea family, a very large family of carbonaceous outer-belt asteroids, named after 10 Hygiea, which is the main belt's fourth-largest asteroid. However, it is a non-family background asteroid according to another HCM-analysis by Milani and Knežević (AstDys).

It orbits the Sun in the outer asteroid belt at a distance of 2.7–3.5 AU once every 5 years and 4 months (1,961 days; semi-major axis of 3.07 AU). Its orbit has an eccentricity of 0.13 and an inclination of 6° with respect to the ecliptic. The body's observation arc begins at Vienna Observatory on 1 March 1917, or four nights after its official discovery observation.

Naming 

This minor planet was named by Palisa after Friedrich Kovacs (1861–1931), a Vienna physician and internists, who successfully treated and restored the health of the discoverer's wife. The famed Viennese cardiologist also treated Gustav Mahler, who had a defective heart. Kovacs imposed a curtailment of all forms of vigorous exercise, a strict regimen of rest and even the usage of a pedometer to measure the composer's physical effort. These restrictions depressed Mahler and ultimately lead to the Symphony No. 9, his last completed work. The  was also mentioned in The Names of the Minor Planets by Paul Herget in 1955.

Physical characteristics 

In the SDSS-based taxonomy, Kovacia is a dark and common carbonaceous C-type asteroid, while in a spectroscopic study of the Hygiea family from 2001, this asteroid has been classified as a somewhat brighter B-type asteroid. The study finds a significant number of objects of this family to belong to this spectral type. Both C/B-types agree with the overall spectral type for the Hygiea family listed by Nesvorný.

Rotation period and poles 

In February 2008, a rotational lightcurve of Kovacia was obtained from photometric observations by a collaboration of French and Italian amateur astronomers including René Roy, Silvano Casulli, François Colas, Arnaud Leroy, Federico Manzini, Christophe Demeautis and Jean-François Coliac. Lightcurve analysis gave a well-defined rotation period of  hours with a high brightness variation of  magnitude, indicative of a non-spherical, elongated shape. The result supersedes a previous observation by Roberto Crippa and Federico Manzini at the Sozzago Astronomical Station  from November 2006, that determined a lower limit of 6 hours. Due to observed mutual occultation and eclipsing events, the collaboration of astronomers strongly suspect Kovacia to be a binary asteroid with a satellite orbiting it every  days. However, no follow-up observations have been published. , this asteroid is neither listed at Johnstons Archive nor has it any kind of binary status in the Lightcurve Data Base.

In 2016, a modeled lightcurve gave a concurring sidereal period of  hours using data from the Uppsala Asteroid Photometric Catalogue, the Palomar Transient Factory survey, and individual observers (such as above), as well as sparse-in-time photometry from the NOFS, the Catalina Sky Survey, and the La Palma surveys . The study also determined two spin axes of (200.0°, −44.0°) and (38.0°, −50.0°) in ecliptic coordinates (λ, β).

Diameter and albedo 

The Collaborative Asteroid Lightcurve Link derives an albedo of 0.0772 and a diameter of 23.96 kilometers based on an absolute magnitude of 11.5.

References

External links 
 Kovacs, Friedrich (1861–1931), Internist, Institut für Neuzeit- und Zeitgeschichtsforschung 
 Lightcurve Database Query (LCDB), at www.minorplanet.info
 Dictionary of Minor Planet Names, Google books
 Asteroids and comets rotation curves, CdR – Geneva Observatory, Raoul Behrend
 Discovery Circumstances: Numbered Minor Planets (1)-(5000) – Minor Planet Center
 
 

000867
Discoveries by Johann Palisa
Named minor planets
19170225